The 2019 Yorkshire Cup competition was a pre season knock-out competition between (mainly professional) rugby league clubs from the county of Yorkshire.

Background
The original Yorkshire Cup was scrapped in 1993 due to fixture congestion after being played every year since 1905.  In late 2018, a group of lower league Yorkshire based clubs resurrected the Yorkshire Cup as a pre-season tournament to add more interest and intensity to pre-season. The eight founding clubs of the 'new' Yorkshire Cup were; Batley, Bradford, Dewsbury, Featherstone, Halifax, Hunslet, York and amateur club Hunslet Club Parkside.

Fixtures

Round 1

Semi finals

Final

Notes

References

RFL Yorkshire Cup